General Hayes may refer to:

Charles H. Hayes (1906–1995), U.S. Marine Corps lieutenant general
Eric Hayes (1896–1951), British Army major general
J. Michael Hayes (fl. 1960s–1990s), U.S. Marine Corps brigadier general
Joseph Hayes (general), (1835–1912), Union Army brigadier general
Philip Hayes (United States Army officer) (1887–1949), U.S. Army major general
Richard Hayes (general) (fl. 1980s–2010s), U.S. Army National Guard major general
Rutherford B. Hayes (1822–1893), Union Army brigadier general and brevet major general, later President of the United States
Thomas J. Hayes III (1914–2004), U.S. Army major general
Webb Hayes (1856–1934), U.S. Army brigadier general

See also
General Hays (disambiguation)